Buk Fatey To Mukh Foteyna is a 2012 Bengali romantic comedy film directed by Bodiul Alam Khokan, starring Shakib Khan, Apu Biswas and Rumana. The film released on Eid al-Adha of 27 October 2012.

Plot
Riman (Shakib Khan) is the only child of industrialist Mirza Saeed (Kazi Hayat). Riman is loved by his college girlfriend Sohana (Rumana Khan) but Riman considers Sohana just a girlfriend. Sohana and Tulip (Apu-Biswas) are two girlfriends. But they are actually cousins ​​of each other. But no one knows that. However, later on, they find out that they are cousins.

Tulip's father's name is Sharif Chowdhury (Sohail Rana) and Sohana's father's name is Farid Chowdhtogether.al). Amjad Khan (Sadek Bachchu), the aunt of Tulip (Apu-Biswas) wants to own Sharif Chowdhury's property by making Tulip his daughter-in-law. So Amjad Khan conspired to create enmity between Sharif and Farid Chowdhury and separated the two brothers. Amjad Khan's son "Badrul" (Misha Sawdagor) is a goon and a mastan. Badrul wants to marry Tulip. When Tulip's marriage is discussed, Tulip consults her grandfather and brings Riman home to play the role of lover to prevent the marriage, and everyone. reveals that she loves Riman. But Riman comes to act and truly falls in love with Tulip and Tulip falls in love with Riman. Sohana is deeply hurt to know this so she sacrifices her love for Tulip's happiness.

Meanwhile, Riman Farid Chowdhury and Sharif Chowdhury settled the enmity and brought the two brothers together. On the other hand, Sharif Chowdhury decided to marry Tulip with Riman. But Badrul is furious to learn of this decision, and tells everyone that Riman is not Tulip's lover, he is only playing the role of lover. Meanwhile Sohana's father comes to know that Sohana loved a boy and that boy left Sohana. So Sohana's father got angry and brought the boy's parents and found out that the boy whom Sohana loved was Riman! And then everyone misunderstood Riemann as a fraud. But when Sohana's father kept beating Riman due to cheating, Sohana's grandfather came and revealed everything in front of everyone. And this proves that Riemann did all these things for the good of tulips. But in the meantime Tulip was kidnapped by Badrul. After Riman rescued Tulip from Badrul, the police came and arrested Badrul. Then the movie ends with everyone together.

Cast
 Shakib Khan as Rimaan
 Apu Biswas
 Rumana Khan
 Misha Sawdagor
 Sohel Rana as Sharif Chowdhury
 Sadek Bachchu
 Khaleda Aktar Kolpona
 Uzzal
 Prabir Mitra

Soundtrack
The soundtrack was composed by Ali Akram.

References

2012 films
2012 romantic comedy films
Bengali-language Bangladeshi films
Bangladeshi romantic comedy films
Films scored by Ali Akram Shuvo
2010s Bengali-language films